
Year 204 (CCIV) was a leap year starting on Sunday (link will display the full calendar) of the Julian calendar. At the time, it was known as the Year of the Consulship of Cilo and Flavius (or, less frequently, year 957 Ab urbe condita). The denomination 204 for this year has been used since the early medieval period, when the Anno Domini calendar era became the prevalent method in Europe for naming years.

Events 
 By place 
 Roman Empire 
 Lucius Fabius Cilo and Marcus Annius Flavius Libo become Roman Consuls.
 The Daysan River floods Edessa.

 China 
 Gongsun Kang, Chinese warlord of Liaodong, establishes the Daifang Commandery in northern Korea.
 Battle of Ye: Warlord Cao Cao lays siege to and captures the military headquarter of Yuan Shao in Ye.

 By topic 
 Commerce 
 A trade recession in the Leptis Magna region (Africa) is alleviated by Emperor Septimius Severus, who buys up the country's olive oil for free distribution in Rome.

Births 
 Cao Rui, Chinese emperor of Cao Wei (d. 239)
 Dong Jue, Chinese official and general 
 Elagabalus, Roman emperor (d. 222)
 Philip the Arab, Roman emperor (d. 249)
 Wei Zhao, Chinese historian (d. 273)
 Zhuge Qiao, Chinese official and general (d. 228)

Deaths 
 Gongsun Du, Chinese general and warlord (b. 150)
 Ren Jun, Chinese general under Cao Cao
 Shen Pei, Chinese official and minister 
 Xin Ping, Chinese official and minister
 Xu You, Chinese adviser and strategist

References